Hierarchical closeness (HC) is a structural centrality measure used in network theory or graph theory. It is extended from closeness centrality to rank how centrally located a node is in a directed network. While the original closeness centrality of a directed network considers the most important node to be that with the least total distance from all other nodes, hierarchical closeness evaluates the most important node as the one which reaches the most nodes by the shortest paths. The hierarchical closeness explicitly includes information about the range of other nodes that can be affected by the given node.

 
where:
  is the normalized form of original closeness (Sabidussi, 1966).

It can also represent the hierarchical position of a node in a directed network. In cases where , the reachability is a dominant factor because  but . In other words, the first term indicates the level of the global hierarchy and the second term presents the level of the local centrality.

Application 
Hierarchical closeness can be used in biological networks to rank the risk of genes to carry diseases.

References

Graph theory
Graph algorithms
Algebraic graph theory
Networks
Network analysis
Network theory